St. Laurent Boulevard (Ottawa Road #26) is an arterial road in Ottawa, Ontario, Canada. Beginning at the Royal Canadian Mounted Police college complex at Sandridge Road in the Manor Park neighbourhood, St. Laurent Boulevard runs in a straight line, slightly east of south, until it reaches Walkley Road. It then curves west and intersects with Conroy Road and Don Reid Drive. In Ottawa, the name of the street is pronounced exclusively in French, even among Anglophones, as it honours former Canadian Prime Minister Louis St. Laurent. Prior to 1951, it was known as Base Line Road.

Northern section

The northern part of the street, not yet a boulevard, skirts the residential Manor Park neighbourhood. South of Hemlock Road, it passes Beechwood Cemetery, one of the most important in the city, and also several high towers including the 30-story Le Parc building, which is the third tallest in the city.

The road becomes mostly commercial starting from McArthur Avenue up to Highway 417. At the corner of Coventry Road lies the St. Laurent Shopping Centre, one of the biggest malls in the city. OC Transpo's St. Laurent Station (the upper level) is located right beside the on ramp for Highway 417 westbound.

Southern section
South of Highway 417 and Tremblay Road, the road becomes more industrial as it crosses a small industrial district to its east. OC Transpo's (Ottawa's transit company) main offices are located at the corner of Belfast Road, another key industrial road, which is also a link to Via Rail Ottawa station at its western end.

Past Innes Road, it enters another important commercial district until Russell Road. To its east, one can see the Canadian Museum of Science and Technology, a key tourist destination since the 1960s, at Lancaster Road. Also located at the corner of Russell Road lies Elmvale Shopping Centre, a mid-sized mall, serving the Alta Vista and Pleasant Park neighbourhoods to its west.

Branching to the west off Russell Road, it reverts to two lanes and runs through a residential area, then south of Walkley Road it enters a business park including some technology companies. It ends behind the former building of CKKL-FM radio station just west of Conroy Road.

Speed limits
Speed limits vary throughout the road. From there to its end, the limit reduces once more to 50 km/h.

Major intersections
 Montreal Road
 Ogilvie Road
 Highway 417
 Innes Road & Industrial Avenue
 Russell Road
 Walkley Road
 Conroy Road

Communities
 Manor Park
 Overbrook
 Elmvale
 Alta Vista

References

Roads in Ottawa